The Hajj Safar Ali Mosque dates from the Safavid dynasty and is located in Tabriz.

References

Mosques in Tabriz
Mosque buildings with domes
National works of Iran
Safavid architecture